Rahimberdi Baltayev (born 16 June 1986) is a Turkmen footballer who plays for Turkmen club FC Ashgabat. He was part of the Turkmenistan national team from 2012.

Club career
In 2013 played in Azerbaijan Premier League for Kapaz PFK.

References

External links

Turkmenistan footballers
Turkmenistan international footballers
Expatriate footballers in Azerbaijan
1986 births
Living people
Kapaz PFK players
Place of birth missing (living people)
FC Aşgabat players
Association football defenders